Edison is an unincorporated community in Mercer County, West Virginia, United States.

References

Unincorporated communities in Mercer County, West Virginia
Unincorporated communities in West Virginia